A tambour door is a type of door that can open horizontally or vertically. They are constructed of horizontal or vertical slats and roll to the side or up and down by sliding along tracks.

References 

Doors